Gerald E. Wellburn (1900 – 25 May 1992) was a Canadian philatelist who was added to the Roll of Distinguished Philatelists in 1951. Wellburn was a specialist in the stamps of British Columbia and Vancouver Island.

References

Signatories to the Roll of Distinguished Philatelists
1900 births
1992 deaths
Canadian philatelists
Philately of Canada